Lourdes Hospital may refer to:

 Lourdes Hospital, Kochi, Kerala, India
 Lourdes Hospital (Kentucky), Paducah, Kentucky, United States
 Lourdes Hospital (Binghamton, New York), United States
 Lourdes Medical Center of Burlington County, a hospital in Willingboro, New Jersey, United States

See also 
 Lourdes Heart Institute
 Our Lady of Lourdes Hospital (disambiguation)